Cláudio José Ferreira Braga (born 23 November 1974) is a Portuguese football manager.

Managerial career
Braga began his career as youth trainer with the academies of SBV Excelsior, Sparta Rotterdam, Feyenoord, PSV, and Jong FC Utrecht. He had his first stint as manager with Santa Clara in 2014, in the Liga Portugal 2. He returned to the Netherlands to coach various amateur teams, before being appointed as interim manager with Fortuna Sittard. He managed to get them promoted into the Eredivisie in his short stint there. He was then was named the manager of Marítimo in the Primeira Liga on 12 June 2018.

References

External links
 
 Fora de Jogo Profile

1974 births
Living people
Sportspeople from Lisbon
Portuguese football managers
Portuguese emigrants to the Netherlands
C.D. Santa Clara managers
Fortuna Sittard managers
C.S. Marítimo managers
FC Dordrecht managers
Sparta Rotterdam non-playing staff
Feyenoord non-playing staff
PSV Eindhoven non-playing staff
Primeira Liga managers
Eredivisie managers